Allen Eade (born 11 September 1960) is a former Australian rules footballer who played for Collingwood in the Victorian Football League (VFL) during the 1980s.

Eade spent most of his career at Coburg but played with Collingwood in a two-season stint. He then returned to the Victorian Football Association and was a half back flanker in Coburg's 1988 premiership team and on the half forward flank when they claimed a second successive flag the following season. Eade represented the VFA in the 1988 Adelaide Bicentennial Carnival. He is one of three emergencies in the official Coburg 'Team of the Century'.

References

Holmesby, Russell and Main, Jim (2007). The Encyclopedia of AFL Footballers. 7th ed. Melbourne: Bas Publishing.

1960 births
Living people
Collingwood Football Club players
Coburg Football Club players
Australian rules footballers from Victoria (Australia)